Nuritamburia thoracina is a moth of the family Tortricidae. It was first described by Lord Walsingham in 1907. It is endemic to the Hawaiian islands of Kauai and Oahu.

The larvae feed on Perrottetia species.

External links

Archipini
Endemic moths of Hawaii